Makchang ("last viscus") or so-makchang ("beef last viscus") is a Korean dish of either the abomasum (the fourth and final stomach compartment in ruminants) of cattle or the gui (grilled dish) made of beef abomasum. The latter is also called makchang-gui ("grilled last viscus") or so-makchang-gui ("grilled beef last viscus"). Dwaeji-makchang ("pork last viscus") means either the rectum of pig or the gui made of pork rectum, and the grilled dish is also referred to as dwaeji-makchang-gui ("grilled pork last viscus").

They are often served with a light doenjang sauce and chopped scallions. High calcium content and high catabolism for alcohol makes it a favorite anju (side dish for drinking).

Makchang gui is said to have originated in Daegu and the surrounding Gyeongsang region. King Seonjo of Joseon is said to have enjoyed the dish at his inauguration.

Preparation and serving
Makchang is usually grilled over a barbecue, but preparation has to be done beforehand to rid the meat of odd odors and excessive fat. The meat may either be pre-boiled in water seasoned with doenjang, onions, medicinal herbs and such, or pre-marinated in a sauce made of various fruit (apple, Korean pear, pineapple, kiwi, etc.) before grilling.

The dipping sauce is made from a mixture of doenjang, ground beans, ground red pepper, and chopped scallions. Fresh green and red peppers, cucumbers, minari and garlic are sometimes added according to personal taste.

Gallery

See also
Korean cuisine
Chitterlings

References

External links
Makchang photo
Makchang photo

Korean beef dishes
Offal
Table-cooked dishes